Inyo County v. Paiute-Shoshone Indians of the Bishop Community, 538 U.S. 701 (2003), was a United States Supreme Court case.

Background 
The Bishop Paiute Tribe of California owns and operates the Paiute Palace Casino. The Inyo County District attorney had three casino employees under suspicion of welfare fraud, and asked the casino for their employment records. The casino declined, stating that it was against their privacy policy. Upon finding probable cause, the district attorney obtained a search warrant, authorizing the search of employment records of those three casino employees. Subsequently, the district attorney asked for the records of six more employees. The tribe once again reiterated their privacy policy, but offered up for evidence the last page of each employee's welfare application. The district attorney refused the offer. To ward off additional searches, the tribe filed a suit against the district attorney and the county. They stated that their tribe's status as a sovereign made them immune to state processes under federal law and asserted that the state authorized the seizure of tribal records.

The California district court dismissed the tribe's complaint, holding that the tribal sovereign immunity does not preclude the search and seizure of personnel records. In 2002, the decision was reversed, with the Ninth Circuit holding that the executing of a search warrant against the Paiute-Shoshone tribe interfered with their right to make their own laws, and be governed by them.

Decision 
In a unanimous decision, the court vacated the decision of the Ninth Circuit. The court found that  was only meant to protect private rights, not sovereign rights. And since the case rested entirely of the basis that the tribe's sovereign immunity was violated by the search warrant being issued, the tribe could not sue under section §1983.

See also 
 Paiute-Shoshone Indians of the Bishop Community of the Bishop Colony
 Cherokee Nation v. Georgia
 Worcester v. Georgia

References

External links
 

United States Constitution Article Three case law
United States Supreme Court cases
United States Supreme Court cases of the Rehnquist Court
2003 in United States case law
United States Native American gaming case law
United States tribal sovereign immunity case law
Second Enforcement Act of 1871 case law
History of Inyo County, California
Paiute
Mono tribe
Welfare fraud